The Hawk is a  community on Cape Sable Island in the Canadian province of Nova Scotia, located in the Municipality of the District of Barrington of Shelburne County. It is the most southerly community in Nova Scotia, as well as the most southerly anywhere in Canada outside of Ontario. The Hawk is sometimes confused with Port Hawkesbury Nova Scotia, and Cape Sable island is as well as with Sable Island (noted for the wild horses of Sable Island).  The Hawk is named after a schooner that was washed ashore there in the 1800s.  Hawk Beach is considered one of the most beautiful beaches in Nova Scotia, and is a popular place for bird watchers, as all of Hawk Point is a centre for migratory birds.

See also
 List of communities in Nova Scotia

References

Communities in Shelburne County, Nova Scotia
General Service Areas in Nova Scotia
Populated coastal places in Canada